Paradox is the eleventh studio album by the band Steppenwolf now known as John Kay and Steppenwolf. It was released in 1984 (see 1984 in music) on the Black Leather Music label. It was originally released only in Canada and Australia. Bassist Gary Link replaced Welton Gite on this album. It also marked a return to recording at American Recording Studios, last used to record For Ladies Only in 1971.

Track listing
Side one
"Watch Your Innocence" (Jackie DeShannon, Duane Hitchings) – 3:15
"Nothin' Is Forever" (John Kay, Steven Palmer, Michael Wilk) – 3:37
"You're the Only One" (Kay) – 5:11
"The Fixer" (Kay, Palmer) – 2:53
"Give Me News I Can Use" (Kay) – 3:46
Side two
"Only the Strong Survive" (Jerry Lynn Williams) – 3:36
"Ain't Nothin' Like It Used to Be" (Kay) – 3:52
"Slender Thread of Hope" (Kay) – 4:47
"Tell Me It's All Right" (Kay, Palmer) – 3:43
"Circles of Confusion" (Kay, Palmer) – 3:26

Personnel

Jon Kay and Steppenwolf
 John Kay – vocals, guitar
 Michael Palmer – lead guitar, backing vocals
 Gary Link – bass, backing vocals
 Steven Palmer – drums, percussion, vocals
 Michael Wilk – keyboards, programming

Additional musicians
 Jackie DeShannon – backing vocals
 Phil Seymour – backing vocals
 Brett Tuggle – backing vocals
 Duane Hitchings – instrumental contributions

Technical
 Richard Podolor – producer
 Bill Cooper – engineer

References

1984 albums
Steppenwolf (band) albums
Albums produced by Richard Podolor